Emma Drummond (born 1931) is a British writer, who sometimes writes under the pen name Elizabeth Darrell.

Biography
Drummond was born in a Military Hospital, as her father was a member of the British Army. She spent her early childhood in Hong Kong, where her father was stationed. She eventually married a senior British Civil Servant. Her employment was as a WRAC (Women's Royal Army Corps).

Bibliography
At the Going Down of the Sun
And in the Morning
We Will Remember
Scarlet Shadows
The Burning Land
The Rice Dragon
Beyond All frontiers
Forget The Glory
Some Far Elusive Dawn
That Sweet and Savage Land
A Question of Honour
A Distant hero
Act of Valour
The Savage Sky

Footnotes

1931 births
Living people
British writers